Murugan Temple may refer to the following Hindu Temples:

India
 Balasubramaniyaswamy Temple, Vennaimalai, Karur, Tamil Nadu
 Engan Murugan Temple, Engan, Thiruvarur, Tamil Nadu
 Kundrathur Murugan Temple, Chennai, Kancheepuram, Tamil Nadu
 Kuzhanthai Velappar Temple (Poombarai, Kodaikanal Murugan Temple), Kodaikanal, Dindigul, Tamil Nadu
 Murugan Temple, Kumaranmalai, Pudukkottai, Tamil Nadu
 Murugan Temple, Kumaravayalur, Tiruchirapalli, Tamil Nadu
 Murugan Temple, Saluvankuppam, Kanchipuram, Tamil Nadu
 Palani Murugan temple, Palani, Dindigul, Tamil Nadu
 Ratnagiri Murugan Temple, Thirumanikundram, Vellore, Tamil Nadu
 Thindal Murugan Temple, Thindal, Erode, Tamil Nadu
 Thiruchendur Murugan Temple, Thiruchendur, Thoothukudi, Tamil Nadu
 Thirupparamkunram Murugan Temple, Tirupparankunram, Madurai, Tamil Nadu
 Thiruthani Murugan Temple, Thiruttani, Thiruvallur, Tamil Nadu
 Vayalur Murugan Temple, Vayalur, Tiruchirapalli, Tamil Nadu
 Viralimalai Murugan temple, Viralimalai, Pudukkottai, Tamil Nadu

Other places
 List of Hindu temples in Indonesia
 List of Hindu temples in Malaysia 
 Murugan Temple of North America, Lanham, Maryland, U.S.
 List of Hindu temples in the United States